Louis I of Blois (1172 – 14 April 1205) was Count of Blois from 1191 to 1205. He is best known for his participation in the Fourth Crusade and later prominent role in the Battle of Adrianople

Early life 
He was the son of Theobald V and Alix of France. His maternal grandparents were Louis VII of France and his first wife, Eleanor of Aquitaine. Whilst in his teens, Louis joined his father on the Third Crusade.

Louis promulgated a charter in 1196 abolishing serfdom in his domains.

Leadership in the Fourth Crusade 
At the Tournament at Écry-sur-Aisne on 28 November 1199, count Louis and his cousin Theobald III of Champagne were the first major nobles to respond to Pope Innocent III's call for a Fourth Crusade. He left France in 1202, along with a gift of 1,000 marks from his uncle, King John of England. During the July 1203 siege of Constantinople, Louis was one of eight division commanders, the others including Boniface of Montferrat (the crusade leader), Doge Enrico Dandolo (leader of the Venetians), Baldwin of Flanders (who controlled the largest division and later became Latin Emperor of Constantinople), and Baldwin's brother Henry. During the siege Louis was one of the crusaders who had a meeting with Agnes of France, Louis' aunt who had been sent in Constantinople when she was around eight. Though she claimed to have forgotten his mother tongue to the crusaders, she held a private discussion with Louis without the help of any traductor. 
 
Louis was later afflicted with a severe fever for months, and missed participating in the capture of Constantinople in 1204. He was too ill to take part in the subsequent forays of his men into Asia Minor, where he had been created Duke of Nicaea, a title he never vindicated as the city was captured by Theodore I Laskaris, founder of the Empire of Nicaea.

He had just recuperated when he participated in the Battle of Adrianople, where he was slain by a force of Cumans led by Kaloyan of Bulgaria ("Johanitza"). Louis chased the enemy too far, exhausting his men and horses and stretching them over a broad plain, where he brought himself and the Emperor Baldwin I of Constantinople into a trap.

Family 
He married Catherine, Countess of Clermont-en-Beauvaisis, they had:
 Raoul, who died young
 Jeanne, who died young
 Theobald VI, Count of Blois

References

Sources

Blois, Louis I of
Blois, Louis I of
Counts of Blois
Counts of Clermont-en-Beauvaisis
Blois, Louis I, comte de
Blois, Louis I, comte de
Latin Empire people
House of Blois